The Billings Bighorns were a junior ice hockey team in the Western Hockey League who played from 1977 to 1982. The team was originally the Calgary Centennials. They played at the MetraPark Arena in Billings, Montana. The team wore uniforms based upon those then used by the Washington Capitals. They moved to Nanaimo after the 1981–82 season.

NHL alumni

Dave Barr
Murray Brumwell
Rod Buskas
Lindsay Carson
Pat Conacher
Ray Cote
Mike Eagles
Brian Ford
Bruce Holloway
Gord Kluzak
Mark Lamb
Jim McGeough
Jim McTaggart
Randy Moller
Andy Moog
Don Nachbaur
Harvie Pocza
Pokey Reddick
Bob Rouse
Mike Toal
Rocky Trottier
Leigh Verstraete
Mike Zanier

Season-by-season record
Note: GP = Games played, W = Wins, L = Losses, T = Ties Pts = Points, GF = Goals for, GA = Goals against

References

2005–06 WHL Guide

Defunct Western Hockey League teams
Defunct ice hockey teams in the United States
Ice hockey teams in Montana
Sports in Billings, Montana
1977 establishments in Montana
1982 disestablishments in Montana
Ice hockey clubs established in 1977
Ice hockey clubs disestablished in 1982